Viengthong Siphandone (born ?) is a Laotian politician and member of the Lao People's Revolutionary Party (LPRP). She is the daughter of former LPRP Chairman Khamtai Siphandon and sister of Sonexay Siphandone. She currently serves as President of State Audit Organization.

She was elected to the LPRP Central Committee at the 10th National Congress, and to the LPRP Secretariat at the 11th National Congress.

She is the wife of Khampheng Saysompheng.

References

Specific

Bibliography
Books:
 

Members of the 10th Central Committee of the Lao People's Revolutionary Party
Members of the 11th Central Committee of the Lao People's Revolutionary Party
Members of the 11th Secretariat of the Lao People's Revolutionary Party
Governors of Champasak
Government ministers of Laos
Lao People's Revolutionary Party politicians
Living people
Year of birth missing (living people)
Place of birth missing (living people)